The 1966 Five Nations Championship was the thirty-seventh series of the rugby union Five Nations Championship. Including the previous incarnations as the Home Nations and Five Nations, this was the seventy-second series of the northern hemisphere rugby union championship. Ten matches were played between 15 January and 26 March. It was contested by England, France, Ireland, Scotland and Wales.

Wales won their 15th title, with a single loss, while England finished in a disappointing fifth and last place.

Participants
The teams involved were:

Table

(Source: rugbyfootballhistory.com:)

Squads

Results

References

External links

The official RBS Six Nations Site

Six Nations Championship seasons
Five Nations
Five Nations
Five Nations
Five Nations
Five Nations
Five Nations
 
Five Nations
Five Nations
Five Nations